What Were You Wearing is an American touring art exhibit created by Jen Brockman and Dr. Mary Wyandt-Hiebert. It depicts outfits worn when anonymous subjects were victim to sexual assault. The exhibit, which debuted at the University of Arkansas on March 31, 2014, was inspired by a poem by Dr. Mary Simmerling, titled "What I Was Wearing". The aim of the exhibit, which displays a selection from 40 outfits, is to challenge the idea that provocative clothing is the cause of the sexual assault, a stereotype used for victim blaming.

Inspiration 
The artists, Jen Brockman and Dr. Mary Wyandt-Hiebert, are both sexual and domestic violence survivor advocates. Brockman is the director of Kansas University's Sexual Assault Prevention and Education Center, while Wyandt-Hiebert works with the University of Arkansas as the director of Campus Sexual and Relationship Violence Center, formerly known as Support, Training, Advocacy, & Resources on Sexual Assault and Relationship Violence (STAR).

They were inspired to create the installation after reading Dr. Mary Simmerling's poem "What I Was Wearing", which they first read in May 2013 at a conference hosted by the Arkansas Coalition Against Sexual Assault. The poem describes Simmerling's experience of rape during the summer of 1987. She describes the clothing she was wearing at the time of her assault and explains why she remembers it so clearly. The poem ends with the line "I remember also what he was wearing that night even though it's true that no one has ever asked". Soon after they read this poem, Brockman and Wyandt-Hiebert began developing their ideas for the exhibit, gaining Simmerling's permission to use her poem in the summer of 2013.

Design 
The installation was created to challenge the notion that sexual assault can be prevented by the victim alone. Brockman stated in an interview that the aim of the exhibit was to "hopefully reveal the myth that if we just avoid that outfit then we'll never be harmed or that somehow we can eliminate sexual violence by simply changing our clothes". She further elaborated that she hoped that viewers would be surprised at the normality of the clothes shown and would see the similarities between the displays and their own wardrobe, therefore enabling them to see themselves reflected in the stories. Various types of sexual assault are reflected in the art, including date rape, child rape and rape of males.

The artists not only wanted the work to resonate with the viewers, but also intended it to provide comfort to other survivors by showing that the choices they made in their clothing was not the cause of their trauma. They wanted to show solidarity with other possible victims and hope that they could see a story like their own on display and understand they were not at fault.

Brockman summarised her view by stating "Being able to find that peace for survivors and that moment of awareness for communities is the real motivation behind the project".

After the artists had gained Simmerling's permission to use her work, they began asking students of the University of Arkansas to submit their own experiences of sexual assault, detailing what they were wearing at the time. After personal interviews were conducted, Brockman and Wyandt-Hiebert began to recreate the outfits which were described using clothing donated to them by Peace At home Thrift Store in Fayetteville, Arkansas. They collected 40 stories and descriptions of clothing, but the number on display at each installation varies; at the Kansas University show only 18 were used.

Exhibition 
Since its debut in 2014 at the University of Arkansas, the installation has moved around American university campuses to showcase the message to other students. For instance, the exhibition appeared at Ohio University in 2018. At each respective university, a board of students from campus society committees choose which stories to exhibit, with some students donating their own clothes to add to the work.

It has also inspired a number of other similar artworks, including Undressing My Voice, a collaboration by Nu'Nicka Epps, the assistant director for Inclusion Initiatives & Assessment in the Office of Equity and Inclusion at Sam Houston State University, and some of the university's students in 2018.

References

External links
 Installation at the University of Kansas
 Exhibition images as shown in Oregon State University

Art exhibitions in the United States
Works of art
Works about sexual abuse
2014 establishments in the United States